Cerverí de Girona (fl. 1259 – 1285) was a Catalan troubadour born Guillem de Cervera in Girona. He was the most prolific troubadour, leaving behind some 114 lyric poems among other works, including an ensenhamen of proverbs for his son, totaling about 130. He was a court poet to James the Conqueror and Peter the Great. He wrote pastorelas and sirventes and his overriding concern was the complexities of court life. None of his music survives.

Cerverí spent some time under the patronage and at the court of Hugh IV and Henry II of Rodez. He was in Spain in 1269, for he is found that year in the entourage of the then-infante Peter the Great. With fellow troubadours Folquet de Lunel and Dalfinet he accompanied Peter to Toledo. On 26 April at Riello, near Cuenca, he received one solidus for his services. Cerverí's  ("Verse in six languages") copied the metre of either Folquet's  or Sordel's .

Cerverí wrote , a planh, on 26 August 1276 for the death of James the Conqueror. It is direct and almost personal. The troubadour asks the Virgin Mary to show as much mercy to James as he showed on earth, referring to his establishing the Mercedarian Order in Barcelona. The poet Matieu de Caersi wrote a very different planh, for James, moralising and religious in tone.

Sources

Cabré, Miriam. . Barcelona-Palma: Universitat de Barcelona-Universitat de les Illes Balears, 2011. .
Cabré, Miriam. Cerverí de Girona and his Poetic Traditions. London: Tamesis, 1999. .
Gaunt, Simon, and Kay, Sarah. "Appendix I: Major Troubadours" (pp. 279–291). The Troubadours: An Introduction. Simon Gaunt and Sarah Kay, edd. Cambridge: Cambridge University Press, 1999. .
Riquer, Martín de. . 3 vol. Barcelona: Planeta, 1975.

External links
Cerverí de Girona at NARPAN

13th-century Spanish troubadours
Poets from Catalonia
13th-century Catalan people